Monique Charice Billings (born May 2, 1996) is an American professional basketball player for the Atlanta Dream of the Women's National Basketball Association (WNBA). She was drafted into the WNBA in 2018 by the Dream.

College career

UCLA
Billings played basketball at Santiago High School in Corona, California.  She was a 4-year letterman there and also participated in the high jump on the track and field team. Billings was ranked in the top 30 by many recruiting services coming out of high school. She also received an invite to the United States National Team Under-18 trials in 2014.

While at UCLA, Billings contributed from the start. In her freshman season; she played in 37 games for the Bruins and was named to the Pac-12 all-freshman team. During her sophomore season, she started all 35 games. She led the team to the NCAA Division I women's basketball tournament (the "Sweet 16"), where they lost to Texas. Billings also led the team in rebounds that year and was named an honorable mention to the all Pac-12 team. Billings again started all 34 games for the Bruins in her junior year, again leading the team to the NCAA tournament. The Bruins again fell in the Sweet 16. Billings led the team in scoring that year and was named to the All Pac-12 team. During her senior season, Billings led the Pac-12 in rebounds, double-doubles, and offensive rebounds. She started 34 of 35 games for the Bruins, who reached the Elite Eight of the NCAA Tournament for the first time since 1999.

Career statistics

UCLA statistics

Source

Professional career

WNBA

Atlanta Dream
Billings was drafted in the second round by the Atlanta Dream in the 2018 WNBA Draft.

Overseas

Asan Woori Bank Wibee
After the 2018 WNBA season, Billings played for the Asan Woori Bank Wibee of the Women's Korean Basketball League.

WNBA career statistics

Regular season

|-
| style="text-align:left;"| 2018
| style="text-align:left;"| Atlanta
| 32 || 0 || 11.0 || .441 || .000 || .750 || 2.8 || 0.4 || 0.4 || 0.0 || 0.4 || 3.3
|-
| style="text-align:left;"| 2019
| style="text-align:left;"| Atlanta
| 29 || 2 || 19.1 || .389 || 1.000 || .783 || 6.9 || 0.6 || 0.6 || 0.4 || 1.6 || 5.5
|-
| style="text-align:left;"| 2020
| style="text-align:left;"| Atlanta
| 22 || 16 || 27.1 || .400 || .000 || .761 || 8.5 || 1.2 || 1.1 || 0.8 || 1.9 || 8.5
|-
| style="text-align:left;"| 2021
| style="text-align:left;"| Atlanta
| 31 || 9 || 23.9 || .495 || .000 || .675 || 6.5 || 1.0 || 1.2 || 1.0 || 1.4 || 8.1
|-
| style="text-align:left;"| 2022
| style="text-align:left;"| Atlanta
| 23 || 8 || 17.4 || .470 || .000 || .765 || 6.3 || 1.1 || 0.8 || 0.3 || 1.3 || 6.5
|-
| style="text-align:left;"| Career
| style="text-align:left;"| 5 years, 1 team
| 137 || 35 || 19.3 || .441 || .250 || .742 || 6.0 || 0.8 || 0.8 || 0.5 || 1.3 || 6.2

Playoffs

|-
| style="text-align:left;"| 2018
| style="text-align:left;"| Atlanta
| 5 || 0 || 12.8 || .474 || .000 || .579 || 2.6 || 0.8 || 0.0 || 0.6 || 0.4 || 5.8
|-
| style="text-align:left;"| Career
| style="text-align:left;"|1 year, 1 team
| 5 || 0 || 12.8 || .474 || .000 || .579 || 2.6 || 0.8 || 0.0 || 0.6 || 0.4 || 5.8

References

External links
UCLA Bruins bio
Atlanta Dream bio

1996 births
Living people
American expatriate basketball people in China
American women's basketball players
Atlanta Dream draft picks
Atlanta Dream players
Basketball players from Riverside, California
Heilongjiang Dragons players
Power forwards (basketball)
UCLA Bruins women's basketball players